Garrett Sutton (born 1953) is an American non-fiction writer and attorney. He is the founder of Sutton Law Centre and Corporate Direct.

Previously, he has hosted Entrepreneur Magazine Legal Show.

His books have been reviewed by Kirkus Reviews, Publishers Weekly, Booklist, and The State Journal-Register.

Biography 
Sutton was born in Oakland, California. He was educated at Colorado College. He received his bachelor's degree from the University of California, Berkeley in 1975 and J.D. from the Hastings College of Law in 1978.

He is married to Jennifer Boyden and has three children. Residing in Reno, Nevada, he has sat on the board of the Nevada Museum of Art.

Books 
 Sutton, Garrett (2001). Own Your Own Corporation: Why the Rich Own Their Own Companies and Everyone Else Works for Them
 Sutton, Garrett (2003). How to Buy and Sell a Business: How You Can Win in the Business Quadrant
 Sutton, Garrett (2003). Real Estate Loopholes: Secrets of Successful Real Estate Investing
 Sutton, Garrett (2003). Success DNA Guide to Real Estate Investment and Management
 Sutton, Garrett (2004). The ABC's of Getting Out of Debt: Turn Bad Debt into Good Debt and Bad Credit into Good Credit
 Sutton, Garrett (2004). How to Use Limited Liability Companies and Limited Partnerships
 Sutton, Garrett (2012). Writing Winning Business Plans: How to Prepare a Business Plan That Investors Will Want to Read—and Invest In
 Detweiler, Gerri; Sutton, Garrett (2016). Finance Your Own Business
 Sutton, Garrett (2016). Toxic Client: Knowing and Avoiding Problem Customers
 Sutton, Garrett (2020). Scam-Proof Your Assets: Guarding Against Widespread Deception

References

1953 births
Living people
21st-century American writers
University of California, Berkeley alumni